January Zyambo (born September 9, 1980) is a Zambian international soccer forward who plays for KS Besa Kavaje in Albanian First Division.

External links

1980 births
Living people
Zambian footballers
Zambia international footballers
Zambian expatriate footballers
Olympiakos Nicosia players
Kabwe Warriors F.C. players
Besa Kavajë players
KF Vllaznia Shkodër players
Kategoria Superiore players
Kategoria e Parë players
Cypriot First Division players
Expatriate footballers in Cyprus
Expatriate footballers in Albania
Association football forwards